R. Thomas "Tom" Buffenbarger is an American labor leader and former president of the International Association of Machinists and Aerospace Workers (IAM).

Background 
Buffenbarger is a member of the executive council of the AFL-CIO and a member of the Economic Policy Institute's board of directors, serves as chairman of the Labor Advisory Committee to the U.S. Trade Representative, and is a past member of the U.S. Treasury Department's Advisory Committee to the International Monetary Fund. Buffenbarger also once served on the National Advisory Board of the Apollo Alliance and was one of the original 130 founders of the Campaign for America's Future.

Buffenbarger is a member of the National Executive Board of the Boy Scouts of America, the organization's governing body. He is a recipient of the Silver Buffalo Award.

References

External links

 
 
 

1950 births
American trade union leaders
Living people
Machinists
International Association of Machinists and Aerospace Workers people
National Executive Board of the Boy Scouts of America members